
Year 643 (DCXLIII) was a common year starting on Wednesday (link will display the full calendar) of the Julian calendar. The denomination 643 for this year has been used since the early medieval period, when the Anno Domini calendar era became the prevalent method in Europe for naming years.

Events 
 By place 

 Byzantine Empire 
 Emperor Constans II recognises Theodore Rshtuni as ruler of Armenia, after his successful campaign against the Muslims. He names him commander (nakharar) of the Armenian army. 
 Maurikios names himself dux of Rome, and revolts against exarch Isaac (Exarchate of Ravenna). He declares Rome's independence from the Exarchate and from the Byzantine Empire. 

 Europe 
 King Rothari of the Lombards issues the Edictum Rothari, which is the first codification of Lombard law (written in Latin). The edict guarantees rights only for Lombard subjects.
 Duke Leuthari II has Otto, mayor of the palace of Austrasia, murdered. He is succeeded by Grimoald the Elder, the eldest son of Pepin of Landen.

 Britain 
 King Cynegils of Wessex dies after a 32-year reign, and is succeeded by his son Cenwalh (who is still pagan); he marries the sister of King Penda of Mercia (approximate date).

 Persia 
 Peroz III, son of Yazdegerd III, the last Sassanid king of Persia, flees to territory under the control of the Tang Dynasty in China (approximate date).

 Africa 
 Arab–Byzantine War: Arab armies continue their military expansion into North Africa and lay siege to Tripoli. The city is captured after one month.
 'Amr ibn al-'As sends a detachment to Sabratha (modern Libya). The city puts up feeble resistance, but soon surrenders and agrees to pay Jizya.

 Asia 

 Chinese prefectural government officials travel to the capital of Chang'an, to give the annual report of the affairs in their districts. Emperor Taizong discovers that many have no proper quarters to rest in, and are renting rooms with merchants. Therefore, Taizong orders the government agencies in charge of municipal construction to build every visiting official his own private mansion in the capital.
 A Chinese embassy is sent to the North Indian Empire. They are invited by Emperor Harsha, who holds a Buddhist convocation at the capital Kannauj, which is attended by 20 kings and thousands of pilgrims. 
 Taizong commissions artist Yan Liben to paint the life-size portraits of 24 government officials in the Lingyan Pavilion, to commemorate their service and contributions to the founding of the Tang Dynasty.

 By topic 

 Religion 
 Æbbe establishes a monastery at Ebchester, known as Kirk Hill at St Abb's Head near Coldingham (Scotland).

Births 
 Fazang, Chinese Buddhist patriarch (d. 712)
 Li Zhong, prince of the Tang Dynasty (d. 665)

Deaths 
 April 29 – Hou Junji, chancellor of the Tang Dynasty
 September 19 – Goeric, bishop of Metz
 Cynegils, king of Wessex (approximate date)
 Maurikios Chartoularios, Byzantine rebel leader
 Otto, mayor of the palace (Austrasia)
 Wei Zheng, chancellor of the Tang Dynasty (b. 580)

References